The Qazvin vole (Microtus qazvinensis) is a species of rodent in the family Cricetidae. It is found in Iran and is normally given as either part of the Microtus or Sumeriomys subgenus. It is a close relative of M. guentheri distinguished by different pelage coloration and a more complex occlusal pattern.

References

D.E. Wilson & D.M. Reeder, 2005: Mammal Species of the World: A Taxonomic and Geographic Reference. Third Edition. The Johns Hopkins University Press, Baltimore

Microtus
Vole, Qazvin
Mammals described in 2003